Isaac Viñales Mares (born 6 November 1993) is a Spanish motorcycle racer. He is the cousin of former Moto3 World Champion and current MotoGP racer Maverick Viñales, and has competed in the Spanish 125GP Championship, the Spanish Moto2 series, the 125cc, Moto3 and Moto2 classes of Grand Prix motorcycle racing and the Supersport World Championship.

Career statistics

Grand Prix motorcycle racing

By season

By class

Races by year
(key) (Races in bold indicate pole position; races in italics indicate fastest lap)

Supersport World Championship

Races by year
(key) (Races in bold indicate pole position, races in italics indicate fastest lap)

Superbike World Championship

Races by year
(key) (Races in bold indicate pole position) (Races in italics indicate fastest lap)

* Season still in progress.

References

External links
 

1993 births
Living people
Spanish motorcycle racers
Motorcycle racers from Catalonia
125cc World Championship riders
Moto3 World Championship riders
Moto2 World Championship riders
Supersport World Championship riders
Superbike World Championship riders